FK Košice – Krásna was a Slovak football team, based in the town of Krásna. The club was founded in 2010.

References 

Kosice - Krasna
Sport in Košice
2010 establishments in Slovakia
Association football clubs established in 2010
Association football clubs disestablished in 2015